Euchloe hyantis, the pearly marble, pearly marblewing or California marble, is a butterfly in the family Pieridae. It is found on the West Coast of North America from southern Oregon south through California west of the Sierra Nevada crest to northern Baja California, Mexico. The habitat consists of rocky canyons, cliffs, moraines and gravelly flats.

The upperside of the forewing has a narrow cell bar very close to the edge of the wing. This cell bar is usually devoid of white scales. The underside is cream white, the hindwing with yellow-green to green marbling. Adults are on wing from April to early July in one generation per year. They feed on flower nectar, including that of the larval hosts and others such as tansymustard or pussypaws.

The larvae feed on the flowers and fruits of Brassicaceae species, especially Streptanthus species. Chrysalids hibernate.

Subspecies
The following subspecies are recognized:
Euchloe hyantis hyantis
Euchloe hyantis andrewsi Martin, 1936

References

Euchloe
Butterflies described in 1871
Butterflies of North America
Taxa named by William Henry Edwards